Hana Ishiyama Ohara, known professionally as , is a Japanese-American singer and lyricist managed by HoriPro and signed to the Flying Dog label. Born in New York City, Nano sings in both Japanese and English. Nano posted music on YouTube and Niconico before being signed by a record label.

Biography 
Nano was born on July 12 in New York City. She was raised in the United States as a child but then moved to Japan when she was fourteen.

Nano posted covers of Vocaloid and anime songs online, first on YouTube and later on the Japanese site Niconico. She is bilingual, and sometimes wrote English lyrics to the cover songs, giving them a Western touch without losing the original style. Eventually, this led to a record deal with Japanese major label Flying Dog. Her debut album Nanoir was released on March 14, 2012. Nano's first live performance was on March 16, 2013.

Nano has recorded several original theme songs for various anime series, such as, "Bull's Eye" for Hidan no Aria, "Now or Never" for Phi Brain: Puzzle of God, "No Pain, No Game" and "Exist" for Btooom!, "Savior of Song" (feat. My First Story) for Arpeggio of Blue Steel, "Born To Be" for Magical Warfare, "Sable" for M3 the dark metal, "Dreamcatcher" for Magical Girl Raising Project, "Rock On." for the first film of Arpeggio of Blue Steel,  Arpeggio of Blue Steel: Ars Nova DC, “star light, star bright” for Conception, and "Kemurikusa" for Kemurikusa.

Some of Nano's other commercially featured works include:
"Destiny: 12 Kaime no Kiseki" as the opening of the PlayStation Portable game Conception: Ore no Kodomo o Undekure!.
"Silence" as the theme song of the Japanese horror channel Den Of Horror: Horror no Sokutsu!
"Happy Ending Simulator" as the theme song of the arcade game Gunslinger Stratos 2.
"Scarlet Story" as the theme song for the Japanese TV puppet show Sherlock Holmes.
"Infinity≠Zero" as the theme song for the Japanese live action film Bakumatsu Kokosei.
"Paralyze:D" as the theme song of the PlayStation Vita game Re:Vice[D].
"Identity Crisis" and "Restart" for the video game Warriors Orochi.
"Mirror, Mirror" for the PlayStation Vita game Bad Apple Wars.
"Dare Devil" for the mobile phone game "Houkago Girls Tribe."
"Nevereverland" as the theme song for the anime OVA Ark IX.

Discography

Albums

Studio albums

Live albums

Remix albums

Singles

References

External links 

  (in English)

Living people
J-pop singers
American musicians of Japanese descent
American women musicians of Japanese descent
Singers from New York (state)
American expatriates in Japan
21st-century American singers
Utaite
21st-century American women
Year of birth missing (living people)